Pultenaea tarik is a species of flowering plant in the family Fabaceae and is endemic to the Gibraltar Range National Park in New South Wales. It is an erect shrub with hairy, arching branchlets, elliptic to egg-shaped leaves with the narrower end towards the base, and yellow to orange and red to purple, pea-like flowers.

Description
The upper surface of the leaves is glabrous but the lower surface is hairy.

Taxonomy and naming
Pultenaea tarik was first formally described in 2004 by Rogier Petrus Johannes de Kok in Australian Systematic Botany from specimens collected by Bob Coveny near Dandahra Falls in the Gibraltar Range National Park in 1993. The specific epithet (tarik) refers to the Gibraltar Range National Park.

Distribution and habitat
This pultenaea grows in forest on granite in the Gibraltar Range National Park in northern New South Wales.

References

tarik
Flora of New South Wales
Plants described in 2004